Iide may refer to:

Iide, Yamagata, town in Nishiokitama District, Yamagata, Japan
Iide, Estonia, village in Saaremaa Parish, Saare County, Estonia